The Alsancak Mustafa Denizli Stadium is a multi-purpose stadium in İzmir, Turkey used mostly for football matches. The stadium has a capacity of 15,000 and was built in 1929. In 1959 it hosted Turkey's first-ever premiere league game.  The stadium is owned by Ministry of Youth and Sports (Turkey). Due to safety concerns during a potential earthquake, the stadium was demolished in July 2015. It was rebuilt between 2017 and 2021. Opened on 26 November 2021. The name of the stadium was given by President Recep Tayyip Erdoğan in honor of Turkish football player and coach Mustafa Denizli.

The stadium has a special place in Turkish football in terms of hosting many clubs and hosting important world clubs since the first day it was opened. Although Alsancak Stadium hosted more than one club at the same time like other long-established stadiums in the past.

History 
Altınordu Club left its field where the current Alsancak Sports Hall and Swimming Pool is located to the state for the 1971 Mediterranean Games. For this reason, Altınordu signed a protocol with the Prime Ministry General Directorate of Physical Education in 1962 and obtained the right to use Alsancak Stadium together with Altay in return for the field it gave.

Renovation 
A new stadium with a capacity of 15,000 was built on the site of the old stadium, and it was completed in 2021.

References

External links
Venue information

Sports venues completed in 1929
Football venues in Turkey
Alsancak Stadium
Multi-purpose stadiums in Turkey
Süper Lig venues
Altınordu S.K.
Altay S.K.
Sports venues demolished in 2015
Demolished buildings and structures in Turkey